The Caroní River is the second most important river of Venezuela, the second in flow, and one of the longest,  from the Kukenan tepui through to its confluence with the Orinoco River. The confluence takes place in Bolivar State.

Hydraulic regime

The Caroní is one of the rivers with the highest discharge rates in the world, with respect to the area of its basin. The Caroní supplies 15.5 percent of the discharge of the Orinoco river. One of the characteristics of the Caroní's water is the dark color, caused by the high amount of humic acids due to the incomplete decomposition of the phenol content of the vegetation. The Caroní thus belongs to the blackwater rivers, as does the Negro River, or Rio Negro in Brazil, Venezuela and Colombia. In the late 1940s diamonds were found in the 
Caroní basin near the famous Lost World Region which then was accessible only by aircraft and four wheel drive vehicles.

Basin
The river drains the Guayanan Highlands moist forests ecoregion.
This means for the two big rivers that they have very similar hydrographic characteristics. The Caroní itself and its tributary the Paragua are rivers with a staircase, in the sense that many falls and rapids are alternated with stretches with gentle slopes, with many meanders and oxbow lakes (naturally cut off meanders). Among the most important falls of these rivers and their tributaries are Angel Falls, with the highest free fall of the world, almost , and Kukenan Falls, the tenth on the world scale with a  free fall. Others falls with less height but high volume are the Aponwao, Caruay and La Llovizna waterfalls.

Hydroelectric power

National Parks
In the high basin of the rivers that form the Caroni (Aponguao, Cuquenán and Yuruaní) the Gran Sabana is spread out, partly belonging to the Canaima National Park.

Mining
Along the Caroní River between the confluence with the Icabarú River and San Salvador de Paúl, there are several artisanal gold mines, mainly on the left hand side of the river outside the national park, but a few can also be found on the right hand side inside the Canaima National Park. Besides the devastating effects of logging and deforestation to clear the site for the mines, the far greater danger is the use of mercury which poisons the Caroní river, its fauna and inhabitants living along its shore. High levels of mercury have been found not only in the Caroní river but also in Lake Guri and further downstream. The government of Venezuela pledged to reduce illegal mining activities with the sustainable development plan for mining from 2016-18. 

Illegal mining surged under the government of Hugo Chávez, due to the nationalization of mines run by international mining companies and this had the negative consequence of an increase of mercury use as other processes are more difficult and costly to use for illegal, artisanal mining.

References 

Rivers of Venezuela
Geography of Bolívar (state)